The EWZ Bridge over East Channel of Laramie River is a Pratt pony truss bridge that was located near Wheatland, Wyoming, which carried Platte County Road CN8-204 (Palmer Canyon Road) over the East Channel of the Laramie River. The bridge was built from 1913 to 1914 by the Pueblo Bridge Company. The bridge's five-panel Pratt pony truss design with steel pin connections was used fairly frequently in Wyoming highway bridges, and the bridge was one of the older examples of the style.

The bridge was added to the National Register of Historic Places on February 22, 1985. It was one of 31 bridges added to the National Register for their role in the history of Wyoming bridge construction.

See also
List of bridges documented by the Historic American Engineering Record in Wyoming

References

External links

Bridge over East Channel of Laramie River at the Wyoming State Historic Preservation Office

Road bridges on the National Register of Historic Places in Wyoming
Bridges completed in 1914
Buildings and structures in Platte County, Wyoming
Historic American Engineering Record in Wyoming
National Register of Historic Places in Platte County, Wyoming
Pratt truss bridges in the United States
Metal bridges in the United States